Sail Melbourne is an annual sailing Regatta run by Yachting Victoria at various yacht clubs around Port Phillip Bay.  Sail Melbourne is a Grade 1 ISAF (International Sailing Federation) event.

Asia Pacific Regatta
The annual Asia Pacific Regatta as a part of Sail Melbourne consists of invited Olympic classes.

Laser Full Rig
The Laser Full Rig is a single handed mono hull with a single sail.  Due to the simple design of the Laser, the racing is more focused of the ability of the crew instead of the boat.

Laser Radial
The Laser Radial is the Laser sailed by women in the Olympics.  It has a smaller sail area and shorter mast than the full rig.

Tornado
The Tornado is a two-person, double trapeze Catamaran with an asymmetrical spinnaker.

49er
The 49er is a two-person, double trapeze mono hull  with an asymmetrical spinnaker.

Finn
The Finn is a single handed men's class.

470 Men's and Women's
The 470 is a class broken up into Men's and Women's.  It is a two-person, 4.7m mono hull with single trapeze and symmetrical spinnaker.

References

External links
Sail Melbourne Website
International Sailing Federation
Yachting Australia
Yachting Victoria
470 Website
Finn Class Website
Laser Website
Photography Website by Jeff Crow

Port Phillip
Sailing competitions in Australia
Sports competitions in Melbourne
Annual sporting events in Australia
Sailing regattas
Sailing World Cup